Amalda aureomarginata is a species of sea snail, a marine gastropod mollusk in the family Ancillariidae.

Description

Distribution

References

External links
 Kilburn R.N. & Bouchet P. (1988). The genus Amalda in New Caledonia (Olividae, Ancillinae). Bulletin du Muséum National d'Histoire Naturelle. ser. 4, section A (Zoologie), 10: 277–300

aureomarginata
Gastropods described in 1988